Rakitnica may refer to:
 Rakitnica, river in Bosnia and Herzegovina, tributary of Neretva river;
 Rakitnica (Trnovo), village in the municipality of Trnovo, Bosnia and Herzegovina;
 Rakitnica, Ribnica, village in the municipality of Ribnica, Slovenia.